Miloš Pavlović (born 8 October 1982) is a Serbian professional racing driver.

Biography

Karting

Pavlović was born in Belgrade. His career began in 1991 in go-karts, winning two national titles the following year. He went in 1993 to Italy, where in his very first season, Miloš became regional champion of Italy, reached second place in the Winter Cup and was very successful in a dozen other races. He became vice-champion of Europe in Portugal (Braga), and he came third in the World Championship in Italy (Ugento), and was named Yugoslav Driver of the Year.

In 1996, Pavlović became the youngest-ever winner of the Karting World Cup, winning the prestigious "Ayrton Senna Trophy”, and was awarded in 2003 a prize for his contribution to the development of the sport by the governing body of karting, the CIK.

Formula Vauxhall

During 1997, he tested in various formulas and completed the Jim Russell Racing Drivers School in Formula Vauxhall in England, winning at Donington Park.

In 1998, Pavlović competed in the Formula Vauxhall Junior Championship. However, lack of finance meant that he took part in 12 out of the 16 races in the season, and finished in 10th. Staying in the championship for 1999, he achieved two pole positions, two wins and three podium finishes. He denied of a shot at the title when his gearbox failed at Thruxton, leaving him fourth in the standings at seasons' end.

Formula Three

He moved up to British Formula Three in 2000, debuting with new team RC Motorsport. He finished 11th in the standings with two top-five finishes, and moved back to Italy having struggled to find a budget for 2002. Despite this, he found a drive at Target Racing in Italian Formula Three, and won five races on his way to the title, and becoming the first driver from any of the former Yugoslav states to gain an FIA Super License.

World Series by Nissan/Renault

Pavlović stepped up to the World Series Lights championship in 2003, driving for Epsilon by Graff, finishing third. He won the title at his second attempt with Italian team Vergani Racing having won seven out of sixteen races, and duly stepped up to the main series. Finishing 17th and 11th in his first two seasons, he managed two wins with Draco Racing on his way to third in the championship.

GP2 Series

Pavlović stepped up to GP2 for 2008 with BCN Competicion, however was dropped after three rounds in favour of Brazilian Carlos Iaconelli.

FIA Formula Two Championship

For 2009, Pavlović moved into the reborn FIA Formula Two Championship. Pavlović finished in ninth place overall despite retiring from a third of the races.

FIA GT1 World Championship

Pavlović debuted in the FIA GT1 World Championship in 2011, driving for Belgian Racing alongside Czech Martin Matzke. The team scored two 12th places in Abu Dhabi and 11th place at Zolder before he was replaced with Frenchman Antoine Leclerc. He returned with Sunred Engineering in 2012, with a best result of 9th in Portugal.

Lamborghini Blancpain Super Trofeo

In 2014, Pavlović joined the Italian racing team Bonaldi Motorsport in the Lamborghini Super Trofeo series. Sharing a drive with Edoardo Piscopo, Pavlović won both the Pro Division of the European and World Championships, becoming the first duo to win the title. He competed in the Pro-Am class of the European Division in 2015, winning at Circuit Paul Ricard.

ADAC GT Masters 
In 2016, Pavlović joined the Bonaldi team's ADAC GT Masters assault. Driving with Patrick Kujala, the entry scored a total of seven points with three points-paying finishes.

Results

Complete Formula Renault 3.5 Series results
(key) (Races in bold indicate pole position) (Races in italics indicate fastest lap)

Complete GP2 Series results
(key) (Races in bold indicate pole position) (Races in italics indicate fastest lap)

Complete GP2 Asia Series results
(key) (Races in bold indicate pole position) (Races in italics indicate fastest lap)

Complete FIA Formula Two Championship results
(key) (Races in bold indicate pole position) (Races in italics indicate fastest lap)

Complete GT1 World Championship results

* Season still in progress.

References

External links
Official website

1982 births
Sportspeople from Belgrade
Serbian racing drivers
Auto GP drivers
British Formula Three Championship drivers
Italian Formula Three Championship drivers
Living people
GP2 Series drivers
FIA Formula Two Championship drivers
GP2 Asia Series drivers
World Series Formula V8 3.5 drivers
FIA GT1 World Championship drivers
ADAC GT Masters drivers
24 Hours of Daytona drivers
24H Series drivers
Karting World Championship drivers
Draco Racing drivers
Cram Competition drivers
EuroInternational drivers
Target Racing drivers
RC Motorsport drivers
Graff Racing drivers
Lamborghini Super Trofeo drivers